Glauco Santoni (born 19 January 1952) is an Italian former professional racing cyclist. He rode in four editions of the Tour de France.

References

External links
 

1952 births
Living people
Italian male cyclists
Cyclists from Emilia-Romagna